In program analysis, a polyvariant or context-sensitive analysis (as opposed to a monovariant or context-insensitive analysis) analyzes each function multiple times—typically once at each call site—to improve the precision of the analysis. Polyvariance is common in data-flow and pointer analyses.

Forms of polyvariance include:

 Call-site sensitivity
 The Cartesian product algorithm
 Object sensitivity
 Type sensitivity

The first two are more often used for dataflow analyses, the latter two are more frequently used for pointer analyses.

References

Sources

Program analysis
Polymorphism (computer science)